Anna of Hungary (Kingdom of Hungary,  1260–1281) was a Princess of Hungary and Croatia, daughter of Stephen V of Hungary and Elizabeth the Cuman. Anna was granddaughter of Béla IV of Hungary.

On 8 November 1273, Anna married Andronikos II Palaiologos.

According to George Pachymeres, the couple had two children:
Michael IX Palaiologos
Constantine Palaiologos, despotes.

Anna died before her husband became senior emperor in 1282. However every Palaiologos emperor to the Fall of Constantinople in 1453 descended from her through her son Michael. Anna's sister Elisabeth and Simonida (daughter of Anna's husband by another wife) both married King of Serbia.

Ancestry

References

Sources

1260s births
1281 deaths
House of Árpád
Palaiologos dynasty
13th-century Byzantine empresses
Hungarian princesses
People of Cuman descent
13th-century Hungarian women
Daughters of kings
Mothers of Byzantine emperors